Osmunda spectabilis, known as American royal fern, is a species of fern native to a large area of the New World, from the eastern half of Canada and the United States to Argentina.

Description
Osmunda spectabilis is an easy fern to recognize in the New World flora. Although it closely resembles species O. regalis, O. japonica, and O. lancea, only O. spectabilis is found growing naturally in the New World. The fronds of O. spectabilis can exceed 1 meter in length and are bipinnate. The pinnules are attached by a very narrow base. The plant produces separate sterile and fertile fronds. Fertile fronds are similar to the sterile fronds, in the lower and middle portions, but the top-most pinnae are fertile and they are much reduced and brown when mature in the early summer.

Distribution and habitat
American royal fern is most commonly found growing in wetter soils such as those found in wet forests, bogs, and along streams and lakes.

Taxonomy

Osmunda spectabilis was formerly considered to be a variety of Osmunda regalis (Osmunda regalis var. spectabilis). Another variety, Osmunda spectabilis var. brasiliensis, (formerly Osmunda regalis var. brasiliensis) also exists in tropical regions of Central and South America, but it is only recognized by some authors.

Osmunda angustifolia, Osmunda bromeliifolia, and all extinct Osmunda species are missing from this cladogram. The classification is based on the genetic analysis presented in "The Paraphyly of Osmunda is Confirmed by Phylogenetic Analyses of Seven Plastid Loci."

References

Osmundales
Ferns of the Americas
Plants described in 1810